This article deals with political slogans of Islamic republic era in Iran.

Slogans of the Islamic Republic and the revolutionaries 
These are the usual slogans of supporters of the Islamic Revolution in Iran, which are frequently used in religious and political ceremonies inside Iran, as well as through the national media of Iran.

 Death to America
 Death to opposer of the guardianship of the Islamic jurist
 Death to Israel
 Death to the three corrupters, Carter, Saddam and Begin
 Death to the leaders of sedition
 Death to England
 The blood in our veins is a gift to our leader
 Death to mercenary in charge
 Alas, if Khamenei orders my striving, the world's army will not be able to stop me
 We love to fight against the Zionists
 God, God, protect the Khomeini movement until the Mahdi reappearance
 Jerusalem, the share of the people, is around here. Any deal that is made is imaginary

Fight, fight until victory 
"Fight, fight until victory" was a common government political slogan among some political-religious parties and groups in Iran after the victory of the Iranian Revolution and also during the Iran-Iraq war.

As an example, this slogan was considered and used in the Iran-Iraq war and in the Karbala-4 operation.

The road of Jerusalem passes through Karbala 
"The road of Jerusalem passes through Karbala" was a common political slogan among some political-religious parties and groups in Iran since the victory of the Iranian Revolution.

This slogan was first popularized by Ruhollah Khomeini and his supporters during the Iran-Iraq war and in the years after that, to the extent that it largely determined Iran's foreign policy.

In the debate of presidential election between Mir-Hossein Mousavi and Mahmoud Ahmadinejad in 2009, this slogan was also mentioned as one of Ruhollah Khomeini's guidelines.

The "thought" behind this slogan is considered by some to be the continuation of the policy of "exporting" the Iranian revolution by Khomeini to other countries in the region.

Slogans against the Islamic Republic 

These are the slogans that are expressed by the Iranians who oppose the Islamic Republic in Iran, which are broadcast in the Persian language foreign media too.

 Our enemy is right here, it is a lie that it is America
 Back to the enemy facing the homeland
 Reformist, Principlist, that's the end of the story
 Reza Shah, may your soul be happy
 Neither Gaza nor Lebanon, I sacrifice my life for Iran

See also 
 Slogans of the 1979 Iranian Revolution
 Ideology of the Iranian Revolution
 Political thought and legacy of Khomeini
 History of the Islamic Republic of Iran
 Background and causes of the Iranian Revolution
 Casualties of the Iranian Revolution
 The Leaders Of The Sedition

References

External links 
 Iran's "Neither East Nor West" Slogan Today
 LITERARY-POLITICAL ASPECTS OF SLOGANS DURING ISLAMIC REVOLUTION OF IRAN
 Politics and Ideology in the Islamic Republic of Iran

Iranian Revolution
Political catchphrases
Political terminology of Iran
Government of the Islamic Republic of Iran